Martin Smith (17 December 1946 – 2 March 1997), was a drummer for Gentle Giant and Simon Dupree and the Big Sound. He played on the first two Gentle Giant albums, Gentle Giant and Acquiring the Taste, before being replaced by Malcolm Mortimore. Smith was a versatile drummer who specialised in playing jazz and blues styles.

Smith died on 2 March 1997, at the age of 50, of internal hemorrhaging. Purportedly he had been very ill with a blood disorder for five years. He continued to drum until two months before his death. 150 people went to his funeral, including many fellow musicians, and Gordon Haskell (of early King Crimson fame) wrote the eulogy.

References 

1997 deaths
English rock drummers
1946 births
20th-century English musicians
20th-century drummers
Gentle Giant members